The NACAC U18 Championships in Athletics is an bi-annual championships to athletes under-18 years of age in the year of competition held between the member associations of the North American, Central American and Caribbean Athletic Association (NACAC). The inaugural edition took place in 2019 in Queretaro, Mexico.

Editions

Championships records

Men

Women

References

External links
2019 NACAC U23 and U18 Championships in Ahtletics Results

U18
NACAC Under-18 Championships in Athletics
Under-18 athletics competitions
Recurring sporting events established in 2019
Continental athletics championships
Biennial athletics competitions